Holy Child College of Information Technology Inc. (HCCIT) was owned by Marivet S. Caballero. As the school’s chief governing body, the Board of Trustees protects the university’s integrity, ensures that it fulfills the purposes for which it was established, and preserves and augments its physical and financial assets. 

It is the only school in South Cotabato, Philippines with two campuses (Surallah and Marbel).

Programs/Courses Offered (Updated: S.Y. 2019-2020) 
Pre-School Department

 Nursery
 Kindergarten 

Elementary Department

 Grade 1
 Grade 2
 Grade 3
 Grade 4
 Grade 5
 Grade 6

Junior High School Department

 Grade 7
 Grade 8
 Grade 9
 Grade 10 

Senior High School Department
(Academic Track)

 ABM - Accountancy, Business and Management
 GAS - General Academic Strand
 STEM - Science, Technology, Engineering and Mathematics
 HUMSS - Humanities and Social Sciences

(Technical Vocational Livelihood Track)

 Computer System Servicing NC II
 Computer Programming
 Animation
 Cookery
 Housekeeping
 Wellness Massage
 Food and Beverage Services
 Consumer Electronics Servicing

College Department

 BSIT - Bachelor of Science in Information Technology
 BSCS - Bachelor of Science in Computer Science
 ACT - Associate in Computer Technology track to Bachelor of Science in Information Technology (BSIT)
 ACT - Associate in Computer Technology track to Bachelor of Science in Computer Science (BSCS)
 BSBA-MM - Bachelor of Science Business Administration major in Marketing Management
 BSOA - Bachelor of Science in Office Administration
 BSE - Bachelor of Science in Entrepreneurship
 BSA - Bachelor of Science in Accountancy
 BSP - Bachelor of Science in Pharmacy
 BSAIS - Bachelor of Science in Accounting Information System
 BTVTEd - Bachelor of Technical-Vocational Teacher Education
 BECEd - Bachelor of Early Childhood Education
 BSC - Bachelor of Science in Criminology

Campus

Main: Allah Valley Drive, Surallah, South Cotabato
Koronadal Campus: Gensan Drive, Koronadal City

External links
 HCCIT Official website

Universities and colleges in South Cotabato
Education in Koronadal